Esther Leslie  (b. 1964) is a Professor of Political Aesthetics at Birkbeck, University of London. She has taught at Birkbeck since January 2000. She has written on Walter Benjamin, Adorno, Kracauer and the Frankfurt School, and explored themes such as animation, chemical industries, including IG Farben and Imperial Chemical Industries, liquid crystals, fascism and culture, Weimar radio, screen and digital cultures, Marxism and Anarchism, fashion, design and craft, Romanticism, and Black radicalism in Somers Town.  

Leslie was formerly a Lecturer in Cultural and Media Studies at the University of East London and also taught on the contextual studies programme of the Art School at Middlesex University and in Communication Studies at London Guildhall University. She oversaw the final period of the MRes/PhD programme of the London Consortium, on which she had taught a course on Cold with Steven Connor. 

Leslie was elected as a Fellow of the British Academy in 2019. She is co-director of the Birkbeck Institute for the Humanities. She is one of the developers of the Arts and Humanities Research Council-funded project Animate Assembly, which provides an expanded glossary of animation 

Leslie is a co-founder and academic lead at the People's Museum: Somers Town. She curated the lead exhibition - Lost and Found: Somers Town, which opened in May 2022. She is a founding editor of the journal Historical Materialism: Research in Critical Marxism. For several years, she was on the editorial collective of Radical Philosophy. She was an editor of Revolutionary History, a journal of Trotskyist history, inter alia.  A career-spanning interview is hosted on various sites, including the Verso blog. Her partner is Ben Watson. She is the granddaughter of Charles Lahr.

Selected publications
Leslie, E. and Juarez, G. (eds.) 2018. Flux until sunrise, a booklet for Geraldine Juarez. Sweden: Rojal Förlag.
Leslie, E. and Jackson, M. 2018 Deeper in the pyramid. London, UK: Banner Repeater.
Lori, M., Chalmers, C., Evans, G. Mooney, S., Mudie, P., Taberham, P., Sheehan, R., Hamblyn, N., Leslie, E.and Lori, M. (eds). 2018. Stan Brakhage: the realm buster. London, UK: John Libbey.
Leslie, E. 2016. Liquid crystals: the art and science of a fluid form. London, UK: Reaktion.
Leslie, E.,2017.  Dolbear, S., and Truskolaski, S., (eds.) 2016. Walter Benjamin: the storyteller. London, UK: Verso.
Leslie, E. 2007. Synthetic Worlds: Nature, Art and the Chemical Industry. London, UK: Reaktion.
Leslie, E. 2015. Derelicts: Thought Worms from the Wreckage<. London, UK: Unkant.
Leslie, E. 2000. Hollywood Flatlands: Animation, Critical Theory and the Avant Garde. London, UK: Verso.

Selected media work

Thought Cloud, an essay for series Head in the Clouds, broadcast on BBC Radio 3 on 26 Feb 2009.

Walter Benjamin, a episode of In Our Time, BBC Radio 4, 10 Feb 2022.

References

1964 births
Fellows of the British Academy
Academics of Birkbeck, University of London
Living people